Raphael Cavalcante Veiga (born 19 June 1995), known as Raphael Veiga, is a Brazilian footballer who plays for Palmeiras as an attacking midfielder.

Club career
Born in São Paulo, Veiga represented Portuguesa and Pão de Açúcar as a youth before joining Coritiba in September 2013. He spent two years in the youth setup before being promoted to the main squad in February 2016.

Veiga made his professional debut on 10 March 2016, coming on as a second-half substitute for Thiago Lopes in a 3–0 Primeira Liga home win against Avaí. He made his Série A debut on 23 July, starting in a 1–0 away win against Santa Cruz.

Veiga scored his first goal as a senior on 3 August 2016, but in a 1–3 loss at Vitória. After 19 league appearances and three goals, he was sold to Palmeiras on 19 December, signing a five-year contract.

On 2 January 2018, after being sparingly used by Verdão, Veiga moved to Atlético Paranaense on a one-year loan deal. While on loan, he became a regular starter, and scored seven goals as the club finished seventh; he was also an important unit in the 2018 Copa Sudamericana, as Furacão ended up champions.

Back to Palmeiras for the 2019 season, Veiga was not a regular starter under managers Luiz Felipe Scolari and Vanderlei Luxemburgo. In 2020, after the arrival of new manager Abel Ferreira, he became an undisputed first-choice and scored in a regular basis.

On 27 November 2021, Veiga scored the opener in a 2–1 win over Flamengo, for the 2021 Copa Libertadores Final.

On 12 February 2022, Veiga scored a penalty against eventual 2021 FIFA Club World Cup winners Chelsea, in a 2-1 loss. Despite being thought of as one of the best players in Brazil, Veiga was never capped by Brazil's head coach Tite. Tite's interim replacement, Brazil's u-20 head coach Ramon Menezes, however, summonned him up to the national team for the first time in March 2023 for a friendly match away against Morocco.

Career statistics

Honours

Club 
Palmeiras
 Copa Libertadores: 2020, 2021
 Campeonato Brasileiro Série A: 2022
 Copa do Brasil: 2020
 Campeonato Paulista: 2020, 2022
 Recopa Sudamericana: 2022
 Supercopa do Brasil: 2023

Atlético Paranaense
 Copa Sudamericana: 2018

Individual 
Copa do Brasil Golden Ball: 2020
Copa do Brasil Team of the final: 2020
Copa Libertadores Team of the Year: 2021
Campeonato Brasileiro Série A Team of the Year: 2021
Bola de Prata: 2021
South American Team of the Year: 2021
Man of the Match the 2021 FIFA Club World Cup: Palmeiras 2x0 Al Ahly
Campeonato Paulista Team of the Year: 2022

Top Scorer
Supercopa do Brasil: 2021 (2 goals)
FIFA Club World Cup: 2021 (2 goals)
Recopa Sudamericana: 2022 (1 goal)
Supercopa do Brasil: 2023 (2 goals)

References

External links

1995 births
Living people
Footballers from São Paulo
Brazilian footballers
Association football midfielders
Campeonato Brasileiro Série A players
Coritiba Foot Ball Club players
Sociedade Esportiva Palmeiras players
Club Athletico Paranaense players
Copa Libertadores-winning players